Kunjargad Fort or Kombad Fort  is a fort located  from Kalyan by way of Khireshwar. The fort is in Akole taluka in Ahmednagar district in Maharashtra. The name of the fort is derived from the word “kunj”, meaning elephant in Sanskrit, due to the fort's resemblance to an elephant.

History
Not much history of the fort is known. Shivaji halted at this fort in 1670.

See also 
 List of forts in Maharashtra
 List of forts in India

References 

Buildings and structures of the Maratha Empire
Forts in Ahmednagar district